HSwMS Trossö (A264) is an auxiliary ship in the Swedish Navy. She was built in Finland for the Soviet Navy as an Akademik Shuleykin-class ice-strengthened patrol craft tender, launched in 1984 as Arnold Veymer and renamed Livonia in 1991. Her sister ships were Akademik Shuleykin, Akademik Gamburtsev, Professor Molchanov, Professor Multanovskiy, Geolog Dmitriy Nalivkin, Professor Polshkov, Professor Khromov and Akademik Shokalskiy.

History 
Arnold Veymer, named after Arnold Veimer, was built in Finland in 1984 for the Soviet Academy of Sciences as an oceanographic ship. She was transferred to Estonia to carry out marine research in the Baltic Sea and in the Atlantic.

The Swedish Navy bought the ship from Estonia in September 1996 and she entered service in 1998 as HSwMS Trossö (A264). She was refitted in 2003 at Falkvarv, Falkenberg and now serves the 4th Naval Warfare Flotilla as a support ship. She also serves as a command ship during larger exercises.

On 21 October 2009 the ship returned to Karlskrona. The home transportation was done with the semi-submersible heavy-lift ship, MV Eide Transporter.

References

External links
 Swedish Armed Forces - HMS Trossö 
 3rd Surfacewarfare Flotilla - 34th Supportdivision 
 World Navies Today - Trosso patrol craft tender 
 Örlogsboken 2003 

Naval ships of Sweden
1984 ships
Akademik Shuleykin-class oceanographic research vessels of the Swedish Navy
Ships built in Turku